Ottaviano da Faenza, an Italian painter of the 14th century who was instructed by Giotto, spent the greater part of his life at Faenza, where he died. There are several paintings attributed to him to be found in the neighbourhood of Faenza, and at Bologna.

References
 

Year of birth unknown
Year of death unknown
14th-century Italian painters
Italian male painters
Trecento painters
People from Faenza